Derbyshire County Cricket Club in 1924 represents the cricket season when the English club Derbyshire had been playing for fifty three years. It was their twenty sixth season in the County Championship and they failed to win a match, finishing seventeenth in the County Championship.

1924 season

Guy Jackson was in his third season as captain. After a steady rise since in the championship table since the low point of 1920, the team slumped to the bottom again in 1924 without winning a match. Jackson himself was top scorer, and Billy Bestwick took most wickets with 65.

Players making their debut were Fred Heath brother of John, and Archibald Ackroyd both of whom played in a later season, but in few matches overall. Edward Bedford and Alfred Rose played their only appearances for Derbyshire in the season with one match each.

Matches

Statistics

County Championship batting averages

County Championship bowling averages

Wicket-keeper

Harry Elliott Catches 29, Stumping 8

See also
Derbyshire County Cricket Club seasons
1924 English cricket season

References

1924 in English cricket
Derbyshire County Cricket Club seasons
English cricket seasons in the 20th century